This is a summary of the year 2008 in British music in terms of the charts. 21 singles occupied the number one position during the year, with 11 being new.

Summary of UK Singles Chart activity

January

The 6 January chart saw The X Factor winner Leon Jackson at number one in the Singles Chart for a third week with "When You Believe". Radiohead achieved their fifth number-one album at the start of the month with In Rainbows, an album released three months earlier on the group's website on a "pay what you want" policy. Nickelback climbed into the top ten with "Rockstar" and Soulja Boy Tell 'Em's "Crank That" climbed to number two.

Amy Macdonald climbed to number one on 13 January with her debut album This Is the Life, six months after the album's release. Swedish DJ Basshunter went to number one with his UK debut single "Now You're Gone". Britney Spears climbed to number two with "Piece of Me", while Lupe Fiasco debuted in the top ten on downloads alone with "Superstar".

London band Scouting for Girls climbed to number one on 20 January with their eponymous debut album Scouting for Girls, on the strength of the success of their singles "She's So Lovely" and "Elvis Ain't Dead". "Chasing Cars" by Snow Patrol overtook "Amazing Grace" by Judy Collins to become the second most charted single in the history of the UK charts with 68 weeks inside the top 75. BRIT School graduate Adele entered the top ten at number two on downloads alone with "Chasing Pavements", while Kanye West's latest single "Homecoming", featuring Chris Martin, peaked at number nine, and "Be Mine!", the fourth single from Robyn's eponymous top 20 album Robyn, climbed 13 places to its peak at number ten.

On 27 January, Basshunter stayed at number one for a third week, holding off the heavily favoured Adele, who failed to climb from her download-only position of number two with a physical release of "Chasing Pavements". Nickelback's "Rockstar" reached a new peak of number three fourteen weeks after its initial debut, and Kelly Rowland climbed to number seven on downloads alone making a jump of 24 places with "Work". On the Albums Chart, Lupe Fiasco's album Lupe Fiasco's The Cool debuted at number seven, and Robert Plant and Alison Krauss's Raising Sand took the runner-up spot and a new peak behind Scouting for Girls.

February

On 3 February, Adele's debut album 19 went in at number one. Nickelback's All the Right Reasons climbed seven places to number three, and Welsh metalcore band Bullet for My Valentine were new at number five with Scream Aim Fire. In the singles, Basshunter held on to the top spot for a fourth week, while Kelly Rowland climbed to number four. There were new entries for electropop band Hot Chip at number six with "Ready for the Floor" and indie group One Night Only with "Just For Tonight" at number nine. British singer/songwriter David Jordan made his top ten debut with "Sun Goes Down" at number ten.

Hawaiian singer/songwriter Jack Johnson's album Sleep Through the Static was new at the top on 10 February. There were new entries for Hot Chip at number four with Made in the Dark and Mary J. Blige's Growing Pains at number six. Basshunter made it five weeks as the number one single, seeing off tough competition from Nickelback (number two) and Adele (number three), while David Jordan climbed to number five. Wet Wet Wet, who went to number one for fifteen weeks in 1994 with "Love Is All Around", scored their first top ten single in eleven years with "Weightless" at number ten, and soft rock band The Feeling also returned to the chart at number twelve with "I Thought It Was Over", the first single from their second album Join With Us.

Soul singer Duffy, who came second in the BBC's Sound of 2008 poll, entered the chart at number one with her retro–pop style second single "Mercy" on 17 February, pushing Basshunter down to number three. Dance act H "Two" O debuted in the chart with "What's It Gonna Be" at number seven, while Goldfrapp's "A&E" climbed into the top ten. United States pop rock band OneRepublic, who had success in 2007 with their debut single "Apologize", were new at number eleven with follow-up single "Stop and Stare".

The 2008 BRIT Awards took place on 20 February at Earls Court in London. Winners included Foo Fighters, Kate Nash, Mika and Take That (see 2008 in British music#Music awards).

On 24 February, Duffy stayed at number one for a second week, while Nickelback were replaced by H "Two" O at number two. Kylie Minogue's "Wow" climbed into the top ten, as did OneRepublic's "Stop & Stare". After a successful performance at the BRIT Awards ceremony, Mark Ronson and Amy Winehouse's "Valerie" climbed back into the top twenty, over thirty weeks after its original release. Ronson and Winehouse also saw an increase in sales of their albums, with Version and Back to Black both re-entering the top five.

March
Three months after its initial release, the deluxe edition of Amy Winehouse's Grammy Award-winning second album Back to Black climbed to number one on 2 March, holding off Goldfrapp's fourth studio album Seventh Tree which entered the chart at number two. Duffy held on to the singles top spot for a third week, managing to keep H "Two" O, Nickelback and Kylie Minogue all from climbing up.

Leona Lewis' double A-side Sport Relief charity single "Better in Time/Footprints in the Sand" peaked at number two on 16 March, earning Lewis her third consecutive UK top three hit. Dance duo Utah Saints climbed into the top ten with the remixed version of their 1992 hit "Something Good", while alternative rock band Panic! at the Disco entered the chart at #13 with "Nine in the Afternoon", the first single from their second album Pretty. Odd.. Duffy stayed on top of the albums for a second week with her debut Rockferry.

On 23 March, London hip hop sensation Estelle's single "American Boy", a collaboration with Kanye West, went to number one on download sales alone, ending Duffy's five-week-long reign at the top of the charts. Madonna returned to the chart with the Timbaland-produced "4 Minutes", featuring vocals from Justin Timberlake, at number seven. Girls Aloud scored their eighteenth UK top ten single with "Can't Speak French" which climbed to number nine, while their rivals the Sugababes missed out on the top ten with "Denial" peaking at number fifteen.

US rapper Flo Rida's "Low" was denied the top spot on 30 March, as Estelle and Kanye West held on for a second week. House musician Sam Sparro climbed into the top ten with "Black and Gold", as did Chris Brown's "With You". Duffy's album Rockferry stayed at number one for a fourth week, seeing off competition from Panic! at the Disco, Foals and OneRepublic.

April
In April, Madonna and Justin Timberlake's "4 Minutes" climbed to number one, earning Madonna her thirteenth UK number one single. Mariah Carey and Usher both returned to the top ten with "Touch My Body" and "Love in This Club" respectively. Hip-hop star will.i.am's second solo single "Heartbreaker", featuring guest vocals from Girls Aloud's Cheryl Cole, entered the top ten, along with British rapper Wiley's "Wearing My Rolex". New albums from R.E.M., The Kooks and Arctic Monkeys' frontman Alex Turner's side project The Last Shadow Puppets all topped the charts. Coldplay released their new single "Violet Hill" on their website as a free of charge download for one week, and it was subsequently downloaded two million times.

May
Number one albums in May were Madonna's Hard Candy, Scooter's Jumping All Over the World, Neil Diamond's Home Before Dark, and We Started Nothing by The Ting Tings, who also went to number one in the Singles Chart with their second single "That's Not My Name". Other new entries to the top ten included "In My Arms" by Kylie Minogue, Duffy's third single "Warwick Avenue", Coldplay's "Violet Hill", which was released commercially on 6 May, and Rihanna's "Take a Bow", which later climbed to number one.

June
After it was featured in George Sampson's winning performance on Britain's Got Talent, Mint Royale's 2005 top 20 hit "Singin' in the Rain" reentered the Singles Chart in June at number one following strong download sales. Other additions to the top ten included American singer and songwriter Sara Bareilles and Australian teen Gabriella Cilmi, along with R&B singers Chris Brown ("Forever"), Jordin Sparks ("No Air"), and Ne-Yo, who climbed to number one with latest single "Closer" - his second UK number one single to date. June was a big month for Coldplay, as they earned their first UK number one single with "Viva la Vida" and their album of the same name also went to number one, selling over 300,000 copies in its first week of release. Albums from Usher and Paul Weller also topped the charts.

July
In July, Dizzee Rascal's project with Calvin Harris and Chrome - "Dance wiv Me" - claimed the top spot on download sales alone; the first UK number one single for all three artists. Basshunter returned to the top five with "All I Ever Wanted", while his debut UK album Now You're Gone – The Album topped the Album Chart for one week. Country rocker Kid Rock made his top ten debut with "All Summer Long", and McFly scored their fourteenth top ten single with "One for the Radio". Other new additions to the top ten included singles by The Ting Tings ("Shut Up and Let Me Go") and Madonna ("Give It 2 Me").

August
On 3 August, Kid Rock's "All Summer Long" replaced Dizzee Rascal's "Dance wiv Me" at number one. One week later, however, American singer–songwriter Katy Perry's controversial debut UK single "I Kissed a Girl" claimed the top spot, after reaching number one in over twenty other countries. Elsewhere in August, Rihanna returned to the top ten with "Disturbia", and folk rock band Noah and the Whale made their top ten debut with "5 Years Time". Girl group The Saturdays made their debut this month with "If This Is Love" entering at #8 - even bigger success was to follow for their debut album and follow up singles later in the year and into 2009. Other new additions to the top ten included singles by Scottish band Biffy Clyro ("Mountains") and Norwegian band Madcon ("Beggin'"). Following the success of Mamma Mia!, ABBA's greatest hits album returned to number one - 16 years after it was originally released. Pop rock band The Script's debut album Script, and The Verve's comeback LP Forth also topped the charts.

September
"I Kissed A Girl" remained at number 1 for the fifth week in a row and Forth from The Verve stayed at number 1 in the album chart. Pussycat Dolls came back (with 1 less member) and their new single "When I Grow Up" which charted at number 3 on downloads alone. Kings of Leon soar to the top of the UK singles chart on 14 September with "Sex on Fire". It remained at the top spot the following week. Ne-Yo's third album Year of the Gentleman enters at number 2 on 21 September. Dreamgirls actress and formed American Idol contestant Jennifer Hudson enters at 15. On 28 September, Kings of Leon stay at number one for a third week. Their new album soars to the top of the album chart, with over 200,000 sales.

October
On 5 October Pink made it to number 1 with her new single "So What". Sugababes made a comeback with "Girls" which got to number 3 on the singles chart.

Oasis (Dig Out Your Soul), Boyzone (Back Again - No Matter What) and Keane (Perfect Symmetry) all had new albums, whilst, Kaiser Chiefs (Off with Their Heads) got to number 2 and Leon Jackson (Right Now) got to number 4 on 26 October.

On 20 October, Girls Aloud scored their fourth number one with The Promise. It was the lead single from their fifth studio album "Out of Control" which would also go on to reach number one in the album chart.

Also on 25 October the twelve finalists of the fifth series of The X Factor performed a new song for the Help for Heroes charity which Simon Cowell predicted will go straight to the top of the charts. It was released on download on 26 October and single on 27 October. Midweek sales revealed that this single had sold 100,500 copies on its first day - more than any single of 2008 so far has sold in a week, and more than twice the average weekly sale.

November
The X Factor Finalists reached number one on 2 November selling over 300,000 copies in its first week of release. On 9 November there were new entries by many well-known female artists including Christina Aguilera ("Keeps Gettin' Better"), Alesha Dixon ("The Boy Does Nothing"), Leona Lewis ("Forgive Me"), Britney Spears ("Womanizer") and Beyoncé ("If I Were a Boy") which charted at 14, 8, 5, 4 and 2 respectively.

Pink's new album Funhouse got the 1st No.1 album of November selling 112,000+, whilst there were new entries by Snow Patrol and Celine Dion, a week later Pink was knocked off the Album chart by Girls Aloud who scored their second number one album with Out of Control whilst there were greatest hits albums from Status Quo and Enrique Iglesias.

Beyoncé got her 4th No.1 with "If I Were a Boy" displacing charity single "Hero" after its three-week reign. The next week it was displaced by Take That's new song, who got their 11th No.1 single with "Greatest Day".

The deluxe version of Leona Lewis's debut album Spirit: The Deluxe Edition was released and shot straight to No.1 knocking off Il Divo's The Promise. Spirit: The Deluxe Edition was then knocked off by The Killers' 4th album Day & Age.

December
Leona Lewis' version of the Snow Patrol track "Run" was released digitally and went to number one on 7 December with sales of over 130,000 copies. Lewis held the top spot the following week too, selling a further 85,034 copies of the single in its second week of release. Take That's fifth studio album The Circus went to number one with sales of over 432,000 copies in its first week of release, while Britney Spears' sixth studio LP - similarly entitled Circus - charted at number four. Many classic Christmas songs, including Wham!'s "Last Christmas" and "Fairytale of New York" by The Pogues and Kirsty MacColl, returned to the chart throughout December.

Alexandra Burke won the fifth series of The X Factor on 13 December, and released her debut single - a cover of Leonard Cohen's track "Hallelujah" - on 14 December. The single sold 576,000 copies in its first week of release, and was the Christmas number one single of 2008. The late Jeff Buckley's version of "Hallelujah" - originally recorded for his 1994 album Grace - charted at number two, following a campaign to raise Buckley's version higher in the chart than Burke's version. Elsewhere in the Christmas chart, Geraldine McQueen's Christmas single "Once Upon a Christmas Song" charted at number five, while James Morrison and Nelly Furtado's "Broken Strings" climbed to number six. "Listen", a song recorded by Beyoncé for the 2006 movie Dreamgirls, returned to the top ten after Beyoncé and Alexandra Burke performed the track together on the final of The X Factor. Take That's  The Circus was the Christmas number one album of 2008.

Number ones

Number-one singles

Number-one single downloads

Number-one albums

Number-one compilation albums

Number-one album downloads

Year-end charts

The Year-End charts were dominated by American and British artists in 2008. Fifteen of the top forty singles were by British people (including featured singles), while twenty were by American artists. Just four other nationalities were represented in the Top Forty: Barbadian (three singles involving Rihanna), Australian, Swedish (both two singles) and Canadian (one Nickelback single). The top 40 albums shows a chart dominated by British acts, while also showing albums from varied international artists.

The year's charts were dominated by Welsh singer Duffy, as her single "Mercy" reached #3 in the year-end charts, with her debut album effort, Rockferry attaining #1. Her single "Warwick Avenue" also charted at #30 in the year-end countdown. Other successful artists included Take That, Leona Lewis and Kings of Leon.

Best-selling singles of 2008

Note: the official list of best-selling singles of 2008 produced by the Official Chart Company and published in Music Week in the issue dated 17 January 2009 originally included "Superstar" by Lupe Fiasco at number 22. The following week (issue dated 24 January 2009) Music Week published a correction by the OCC to the effect that sales of "Superstar" had been overstated and it should have been placed at number 67, with all the original numbers 23 to 67 moving up one place. This has been reflected in the table above.

Best-selling albums of 2008

Notes:

Best-selling compilation albums of 2008

See also
List of UK Dance Singles Chart number ones of 2008
List of UK Independent Singles Chart number ones of 2008
List of UK Rock & Metal Singles Chart number ones of 2008
List of UK R&B Singles Chart number ones of 2008

References

 Top 200 singles of 2008

Charts
United Kingdom
British record charts